Ribolla is a village in southern Tuscany, a frazione of the comune of Roccastrada, in the province of Grosseto.

In 1954, a mine exploded killing forty-three workers. The incident was reported by Luciano Bianciardi and Carlo Cassola in the essay I minatori della Maremma (The miners of Maremma), and has been a source of inspiration for Bianciardi's novel La vita agra and for the film of the same name directed by Carlo Lizzani.

Main sights 
 Santi Barbara e Paolo, main parish church in Ribolla, it was designed by engineer Ernesto Ganelli and consecrated in 1941.
 Monumento al minatore ("Monument to the miner") by Vittorio Basaglia.

References

See also 
 Montemassi
 Piloni
 Roccatederighi
 Sassofortino
 Sticciano
 Torniella

Frazioni of Roccastrada